This is a list of New York State Historic Markers in Onondaga County, New York.

Listings county-wide

See also
 List of New York State Historic Markers
 National Register of Historic Places listings in New York
 List of National Historic Landmarks in New York

References

 
Onondaga
Historic markers